Without Fail is the sixth book in the Jack Reacher series written by Lee Child. It was published by Putnam in 2002. It is written in the third person. In the novel, retired military police officer Jack Reacher is asked by the Secret Service to help track down assassins who are threatening the Vice President-Elect.

Plot
Jack Reacher arrives in Atlantic City after hitching a ride cross-country with a couple of aging blues musicians who dream of playing at B.B. King's club in New York City. He is approached there by Secret Service Agent M.E. Froelich, who had dated Reacher's brother Joe, a fellow Secret Service agent, before his death (Killing Floor). Froelich hires Reacher to conduct a "security audit" of the Secret Service's protection of Vice President-elect Brook Armstrong, the junior senator from North Dakota.

Armstrong attends a meeting and photo-op with prominent bankers on Wall Street, a campaign event in Bismarck with the newly elected senator from North Dakota, and a fundraising event in Washington, D.C. Reacher reveals to Froelich that he hired his old colleague from the military police, Chicago security consultant Frances Neagley, to help with the "audit." Working together, Reacher and Neagley say that they could have killed the Vice President three times for sure, and once probably, in three days.

Froelich reveals that the Secret Service has been receiving letters from someone threatening to kill Armstrong. She and her supervisor, a man named Stuyvesant, agree to hire Reacher and Neagley to help their investigation. Reacher tries on one of his brother's suits, and Froelich sleeps with him. Froelich asks why Neagley and Reacher never had a relationship, and he tells her that, for reasons she will not disclose, Neagley has a fear of being touched by others.

The would-be assassins kill two men, one in Colorado and one in Minnesota, who resemble the Vice President and also have the name "B. Armstrong," as a warning message. A killer appears at another event in Bismarck, but Reacher breaks into the church tower where they were hiding out and they flee without a trace. On Thanksgiving Day, Armstrong is scheduled to serve food at a lunch buffet at a homeless shelter. Reacher and Neagley argue that Armstrong should be warned, and that the event should be cancelled. Stuyvesant agrees to bring in the F.B.I. for help; they send Special Agent Bannon, who concludes based on the weapons used in the Colorado and Minnesota homicides that a Secret Service agent is behind the killings. Froelich moves the benefit lunch outside, where the Secret Service can better control who gets close to Armstrong.

On Thanksgiving, Froelich meticulously secures the area. Ten agents look over the homeless people as they line up to get food from Armstrong, and snipers are posted on the only rooftop that has a clear shot at the Vice President. An assassin kills a Secret Service sniper named Crosetti, and fires at Armstrong twice. They miss with the first shot, and Froelich covers the Vice President from the second. Fatally struck in the neck, Froelich becomes delirious with blood loss in Reacher's arms. She tells him "I love you, Joe," to which Reacher replies "I love you too."

Against the recommendations of Stuyvesant and Bannon, Armstrong agrees to Reacher's demands that he publicly announce he will attend a funeral for Froelich in her hometown of Grace, Wyoming, to lure the killers out into the open. Armstrong insists that his protection detail be limited to three men, out of respect for Froelich's family. Reacher remembers seeing the Thanksgiving Day shooter running with a badge during the assassination attempt in Bismarck, and concludes that the killers are policemen. Reacher also deduces that the assassins are motivated by some personal feud with Armstrong. The Vice President confesses that, as a teenager in rural Oregon, he stood by as his father brutally beat two local bullies with a baseball bat. Armstrong reveals that he received a broken baseball bat in the mail from the killers, something the Secret Service did not pick up on during their postal screening.

Reacher and Neagley fly to Denver and drive to Grace, arriving the day before the funeral. Staking out the church steeple, they watch the assassins arrive and ambush them the morning of the funeral. Neagley and Reacher kill the assassins, who are revealed to be cops from rural Idaho.

Back at the Denver airport, Neagley gives Reacher a quick hug before catching the plane to Chicago. Reacher flies to New York, and stops at B.B. King's club to see if the musicians made it there from Atlantic City. An usher says no one matching their description has played at the club. Reacher heads toward the Port Authority Bus Terminal to catch a ride out of town.

Main characters
Jack Reacher: hero, brother of Froelich's former boyfriend Joe.
M. E. Froelich: U.S Secret Service Agent in charge of V.P.-Elect Brook Armstrong's protection detail. 
Frances Neagley: Jack's colleague, now a private investigator; a member of Jack's former Army unit, the 110th MP Company.
Brook Armstrong: Vice President-elect of the United States
Stuyvesant: Froehlich's supervising agent at the US Secret Service
Bannon: FBI SAC (special agent in charge) investigating the threats

Bad Luck and Trouble, the eleventh Reacher novel, is dedicated, "For the real Frances L. Neagley", who is a real person.  Frances Neagley won a Bouchercon charity auction to have a character named after her in Child's novels

Awards and nominations
2003 Dilys Award nomination.
2003 Barry Award nomination, Best Novel.

See also
Assassinations in fiction

References

External links
Without Fail information page on Child's official website

2002 British novels
American thriller novels
Jack Reacher books
Third-person narrative novels
Bantam Press books
G. P. Putnam's Sons books